In enzymology, an adenosine-phosphate deaminase is an enzyme that catalyzes the chemical reaction

5'-AMP + H2O  5'-IMP + NH3

Thus, the two substrates of this enzyme are 5'-AMP and H2O, whereas its two products are 5'-IMP and NH3.

Classification 
This enzyme belongs to the family of hydrolases, those acting on carbon-nitrogen bonds other than peptide bonds, specifically in cyclic amidines.  The systematic name of this enzyme class is adenosine-phosphate aminohydrolase. Other names in common use include adenylate deaminase, adenine nucleotide deaminase, and adenosine (phosphate) deaminase.

The EC number for adenosine-phosphate deaminase is [EC 3.5.4.17]. The class is (EC 3) for hydrolase. Hydrolases are enzymes that catalyze bond cleavage by reaction with water. The sub-class refers to adenosine-phosphate deaminase acting on carbon-nitrogen bonds, other than peptide bonds. The sub-sub-class refers to the type of substrate the enzyme is binding to, in this case, cyclic amidines. The final number (17) indicates that adenosine-phosphate deaminase binds to 5'-adenosine monophosphate.

Reaction mechanism 
The pathway for adenosine-phosphate deaminase involves two substrates, 5'-adenosine monophosphate and water. This pathway is referred to as amidine hydrolysis. Adenosine-phosphate deaminase binds to 5'-AMP using water to break the C-N bond and replacing it with a carbonyl group. Ultimately, this produces 5'-IMP (Inosine monophosphate) and NH3 (ammonia). Substrate specificities of this class depend on their origin, however, all of them deaminate adenosine, 2'-deoxyadenosine, 5'-AMP, and 3',5'-cyclic AMP. Inhibitors of adenosine-phosphate deaminase include Mn2+ (neutral or alkaline pH), F−, Fe3+, CN−, Co2+, Zn2+, and Hg2+.

Species distribution 
Adenosine-phosphate deaminase is found in most, if not all organisms in all tissues, however, muscle tissue is the richest source. The basic pathway of adenosine-phosphate deaminase is to replace a C-N bond of a 5'-AMP to replace the carboxyl group forming 5'-IMP. 5'-IMP is then catalyzed by Inosine-5'-monophosphate dehydrogenase (IMPDH) in guanine nucleotide biosynthesis. This is at the center of cell growth and proliferation. Specifically within marine mollusks, studies suggest that adenosine-phosphate deaminases are widely distributed across the phylum. However, it was noticed that the pathways varied within each individual species, suggesting that different substrates are preferred within different species. The source organisms for this enzyme are Porphyra crispata, Desulfovibrio desulfuricans, Aspergillus sp..

Function 
Within the cell, adenosine-phosphate deaminase is found within all tissues, but particularly higher in concentration within muscle tissue. Kinetic properties of the enzyme vary widely based on the source and purification of the enzyme. Adenosine-phosphate deaminase binds to 5'-AMP performing hydrolysis, using water to break the C-N bond of the amino group attached to 5'-AMP. This results in binding 5'-IMP is then catalyzed by Inosine-5'-monophosphate dehydrogenase (IMPDH), facilitating guanine nucleotide biosynthesis. The initial step of AMP degradation is the conversion to xanthine into alternative routes, xanthosine or hypoxanthine.

Crystal Structure 
Molecular weight of adenosine-phosphate deaminase is 30000-60000 Da or 15223 Da. The number of amino acid sequences is 135. There are 0 transmembrane helices.

Active Site 
The turnover number for adenosine-phosphate deaminase is 690 ATP, 630 ADP, and 710 AMP. The km value is 0.047 for 5'-AMP. the pH optimum is 6.0-6.8 for 5'-AMP, however the pH range is 4-8 with a temperature optimum of 55 °C. Natural substrates for this enzyme are 5'-AMP and H2O. The substrate spectrum is as follows:

Adenosine + H2O

Adenosine phosphates + H2O

NAD+ +  H2O

dATP +  H2O

dADP +  H2O

dAMP +  H2O

Deoxyadenosine +  H2O

The product spectrum is as follows:

Inosine + NH3

Inosine phosphates + NH3

Nicotinamide-hypoxanthine-dinucleotide + NH3

dITP + NH3

dIDP + NH3

dIMP + NH3

Deoxyinosine + NH3

References

Further reading 

 
 

EC 3.5.4
Enzymes of unknown structure